Mono is the debut studio album by Australian metalcore band Alpha Wolf. It was released on 14 July 2017 through Greyscale Records. The first single "#104" was released on 13 March 2017, followed by another single "Golden Fate; Gut Ache" which was released on 30 May 2017, along with the pre-order for the album. The album debuted at No. 29 on the ARIA Albums Chart in its first week of release.

It is the only album to feature former vocalist Aidan Ellaz before his departure from the band in February 2018, following allegations of sexual assault. It is also the last release to feature founding member Jackson Arnold on drums.

Critical reception

Reviews for Mono were generally positive. Depth Magazine gave the album a 10 out of 10, calling it "a brave expression of intense and real emotion at its heavy finest. Impressively done."

Track listing
All tracks are written by Alpha Wolf

Personnel
Alpha Wolf
 Aidan Ellaz – lead vocals
 John Arnold – bass, vocals
 Sabian Lynch – guitars
 Scottie Simpson – guitars
 Jackson Arnold – drums
Additional artists
 Alana Sibbison – vocals on Track 6
 Debennie Randall – spoken-word vocals on Track 3 & Track 9
Artwork
 Milad Safabakhsh – artwork (Credited to Nick Davies, who stole the design)
Production
 Jamie Marinos – production, engineered
 Lance Prenc – mastering, mixing

Charts

References

2017 debut albums
Alpha Wolf (band) albums